The national flag of Mexico is a vertical tricolor of  green, white, and red with the national coat of arms charged in the center of the white stripe. While the meaning of the colors has changed over time, these three colors were adopted by Mexico following independence from Spain during the country's War of Independence, and subsequent First Mexican Empire.

Red, white, and green are the colors of the national army in Mexico. The central emblem is the Mexican coat of arms, based on the Aztec symbol for Tenochtitlan (now Mexico City), the center of the Aztec Empire. It recalls the legend of an eagle sitting on a  cactus while devouring a serpent that signaled to the Aztecs where to found their city, Tenochtitlan.

History

Before the adoption of the first national flag, various flags were used during the War of Independence from Spain. The Standard became the initial symbol of the rebel army during the Mexican War of Independence. Various other Standards were used during the war. José María Morelos used a flag with an image of the Virgin to which was added a blue and white insignia with a crowned eagle on a cactus over a three-arched bridge and the letters V.V.M. ( – "long live the Virgin Mary"). The Revolutionary Army also used a flag featuring the colors white, blue and red in vertical stripes. The first use of the modern colors—green, white and red—was in the flag of the unified Army of the Three Guarantees (pictured above) after independence from Spain was won.

While similar to the national flag that is used today, the eagle in these arms is not holding a serpent in his talons and a crown has been affixed to the head of the eagle to signify the Empire. Variants of this flag that appeared in this period also included a naval flag that had the tricolor pattern.But only contained the eagle with the crown above its head. The military also used a similar square flag, but the eagle was larger than on the national flag. The national flag was officially decreed by Agustín de Iturbide in November 1821 and first officially used in July 1822. This flag was no longer used upon the abolishment of the empire.

The first national flag was established in 1821, the first year of Mexican recognized sovereignty. The imperial government that was set up chose a tricolor flag of green, white and red and charged with the national coat of arms. The official decree stated that 

The second national flag was adopted after the establishment of the first federal republic in 1823. The new flag was chosen for the republic in April of that year, the only difference being the appearance of the central emblem. The crown was removed from the eagle's head and a serpent was placed in the eagle's right talon. Another addition to the flag is a branch of oak and laurel branches, a tradition that was carried over to the current flag. This flag was discontinued in 1864 upon the dissolution of the first federal republic.

The third national flag was that of the Second Mexican Empire. Once again, the national flag used the green, white and red tricolor pattern with the white stripe being charged with the national arms. However, the ratio of the flag was changed from 4:7 to 1:2 and four eagles, which had crowns above their heads, were placed at each corner of the flag. The design, which was ordered by the Emperor Maximilian, gave the arms a look similar to the French Imperial arms, but he decided to add a bit of "Mexican flavor" to the flag. The coat of arms was described in a decree issued in November 1865 as: 

The current national flag was adopted on September 16, 1968, and was confirmed by law on February 24, 1984. The current version is an adaptation of the design approved by presidential decree in 1916 by Venustiano Carranza, where the eagle was changed from a front-facing to a side-facing position. Before the adoption of the current national flag, official flags have been used by the government. All of these flags used the tricolor pattern, with the only differences being the changes in the coat of arms, which was still charged in the center of the white stripe. One possible reason for the 1968 flag and arms change was that Mexico City was the host of the 1968 Summer Olympic Games. Around this same time period, the plain tricolor flag that Mexico used as its merchant ensign was also legally abandoned. The reasoning is that without the coat of arms, the flag would not be the Mexican flag; it would become nearly identical to the Italian flag.

There was also debate in 1984 about how the coat of arms would be depicted on the reverse of the flag. To solve this problem, a PAN deputy proposed a change to the Law of the National Arms, Flag and Anthem that same year to allow for the eagle to face to the right when the reverse of the flag is displayed. In 1995, the law was changed to include the following:

Design and symbolism

The official design of the Mexican flag can be found in Article 3 of the Law on the National Arms, Flag, and Anthem, passed in 1984. While the exact shades of the flag have not been defined by law, in 2001 it was reported, through personal communication, to Flags of the World that the Interior Ministry (Secretaría de Gobernación) has suggested the following tones in the Pantone system; nevertheless, the ministry has not officially ruled on the matter. So far, there are no official printed documents or statements on the color shades. The Pantone colors listed below were employed by the London Organising Committee of the Olympic Games and Paralympic Games Limited in its "Flag Manual". while 2008 Beijing Olympic Games Flag Manual proposed others.

The article dictates what must be featured on the flag and also its proportions. Copies of the national flag which are made according to this law are kept in two locations: the General National Archive (Archivo General de la Nación) and the National Museum of History (Museo Nacional de Historia).

Differences with Italian flag

The Mexican tricolor (green, white, red) has been continuously used for a longer time than the Italian one. At the time of the Mexican flag's adoption, the similarly toned Italian tricolor had already been used briefly in Europe, for example by the Cisalpine Republic in 1797, but it had different proportions from the modern Italian flag.

Due to the common arrangement of the colors, at first sight, it seems that the only difference between the Italian and the Mexican flag is only the coat of arms of Mexico present in the latter. Both flags use the same colors (green, white, and red), but the Mexican flag has darker shades of green and red (particularly green). Additionally, these flags present a different aspect ratio (proportions): the Italian flag aspect ratio is 2:3 (1 to 1.5), more squarish in shape, while the Mexican flag aspect ratio is 4:7 (1 to 1.75), a longer shape.

The similarity between the two flags posed a serious problem in maritime transport, given that originally the Mexican mercantile flag was devoid of arms and therefore was consequently identical to the Italian Republican tricolor of 1946; to obviate the inconvenience, at the request of the International Maritime Organization, both Italy and Mexico adopted naval flags with different crests.

Protocol

When the flag is paraded in front of a crowd, those in military uniform must present a salute according to military regulations. Civilians who are present give the following salute to the national flag: standing at attention (firms), they raise their right arms and place their right hands on their chests, in front of the heart. The hand is flat and the palm of the hand is facing the ground. This salute is known as the El saludo civil a la Bandera Nacional ("The Civil Salute to the National Flag"). When the President is acting in the capacity of the Head of the Armed Forces, he salutes the national flag with a military salute. When the national anthem is played on television to open or close daily programming, the national flag will be shown at the same time. During certain times of the year, the flag is flown by both civilians and government personnel. Mostly, these events coincide with national holidays and days of significance to the country. During some of these occasions, the flag will be flown at half-mast to honor the death of important Mexicans. These dates are listed in Article 18 of the Law of the National Flag, Arms, and Anthem. The national  Día de la Bandera (Flag Day) celebration occurs on February 24. On this day in 1821, all the factions fighting in the War of Independence joined to form the Army of the Three Guarantees in response to the Plan de Iguala, which was signed by Vicente Guerrero and Agustín de Iturbide, declaring Mexico officially an independent country. General Vicente Guerrero was the first military official who swore allegiance to the national flag. Another flag tradition is that before every Olympics in which Mexico is a participant, the President hands a flag over to the flag bearer, chosen by their peers, to carry with them to the host city.

Civil ceremonies

The flag songs are dedicated to the flag day, it is a national holiday in Mexico. Flag Day is celebrated every year on February 24 since its implementation in 1937. The songs were established by President of Mexico General Lázaro Cárdenas before the monument to General Vicente Guerrero, first to pledge allegiance to the Mexican flag and Agustin de Iturbide:

Pledge of Fidelity 
The following pledge of fidelity is taken every February 22 and any day whenever new flags are given to institutions in accordance with the form established by Article 3 of the Law on the National Arms, Flag, and Anthem:

The pledge taking is taken on this day in a presentation of colours ceremony to units of the Armed Forces, National Guard, law enforcement and emergency organizations, as well as public schools and colleges of the Secretariat of Education.

Variants

There are two variants of the national flag that are mostly used by the state and federal governments, the difference between the national flag and the variants are the designs of the coat of arms. In the first variant, which is used by the President of Mexico and secretaries of federal bodies, the entire coat of arms is coloured gold, with the exception of the tricolour ribbon, which is green, white and red, and with the stone, lake and talons of the eagle coloured in silver. In the second variant, the entire coat of arms is coloured gold, even the ribbon, lake, stone and talons. The second variant is used mostly by the state governments and federal bodies who are not able to use the first variant.

Law articles
 In Article 3 of the Law on the National Arms, Flag and Anthem (Ley sobre el Escudo, la Bandera y el Himno Nacionales) also describes that the national flag can be decorated with a special tie called a corbata (cravat). The corbata is composed of a bow, two ribbons of different length and both ribbons are attached with a golden tassel called fringe. The corbata is placed on the top of the flag at the point where the truck is, and the colours of the corbata match that of the national flag. Organizations and political parties can adopt their own corbatas, such as the National Action Party (PAN), which uses a white corbata with blue fringes.
 In Article 3 of the Flag Law does not give an official symbolism to the colors, other meanings may be given to them. Other groups have used the national colors as part of their own logos or symbols. For example, the Institutional Revolutionary Party (PRI) political party has adopted the national colors as part of their logo. Another political party, the Party of the Democratic Revolution (PRD), also had the national colors as part of their logo, but changed them in the 1990s after a controversy surrounding impartiality issues, while the PRI did not. Several states, such as Querétaro and Hidalgo have incorporated either elements of the national flag, or even the entire flag, into their coat of arms.

Regulations for use
The image of the flag is protected under law. A special permit is needed to broadcast its image. In February 2010, MTV Mexico controversially canceled a much-publicized broadcast of an episode of South Park, called "Pinewood Derby", featuring the flag, because it claimed that the permit had not been issued.

In 2008, Mexican pop singer Paulina Rubio was fined for posing nude
wrapped in the flag in a photo shoot for a Spanish magazine.

Others 
Other flags were flown as Mexican flags, either designed to intimidate the enemy or to act as identification. These flags were considered without subsequent formal documentation as national flag and temporally situated; Flag of Francisco I. Madero (February 9, 1913), Flag of Doliente Hidalgo (January 2, 1812), Flag of José María Morelos y Pavón, Flag of Francisco Villa, Flag of Siera Battalion, Flag of Jalisco Battalion, Libres de Puebla Battalion, Artillería Mina Battalion, Oaxaca Battalion, Toluca Battalion, Flag of Chihuahua Battalion, Flag of Durango Battalion, Flag of San Lorenzo Battalion, Flag of Lanceros Battalion, Flag of San Luis Potosí Battalion, Flag of Aguascalientes Battalion, Flag of Galeana Battalion (May 22, 1864), Flag of San Blas Battalion (September 24, 1846), Flag of Tres Villas Battalion, Flag of Milicias Battalion, Flag of Remixto Battalion, Flag of Quautla Battalion, Flag of 201 Squadron, Etc.

Monumental flags

In 1999, President of Mexico Ernesto Zedillo started a program erecting giant flags across the country. Directed by the Secretariat of National Defense, the banderas monumentales (monumental flags) were placed in various cities and spots, most of which are of great significance to the nation. In a decree issued on July 1, 1999, by Zedillo, the flags were to be placed in Mexico City, Tijuana, Ciudad Juárez, and Veracruz. After these initial monumental flags were created, cities such as Ensenada, Nuevo Laredo and Cancún were reported to have their own monumental flags. Smaller flags, called banderas semi-monumentales, have been erected in smaller towns and at various educational institutes.

As of December 22, 2010, the biggest Mexican flag in the world is now located in Piedras Negras, Coahuila. Located at the Gran Plaza (Great Plaza) right across from International Bridge I connecting Piedras Negras with Eagle Pass, Texas. The flag measures  and weighs .

The flag measures  and weighs , four times the size of most other monumental flags at the time.

Example locations:

 Piedras Negras, Coahuila
 Monterrey, Nuevo León
 Querétaro, Querétaro
 Mexico City:
 Zócalo, in the city center
 Campo Militar Marte, military base behind Los Pinos
 San Jerónimo roundabout, in Periférico Sur
 Chihuahua, Chihuahua
 Ciudad Juárez, Chihuahua
 Iguala, Guerrero
 Tonalá, Jalisco
 Mérida, Yucatán
 Cancún, Quintana Roo
 Mexicali, Baja California
 Tampico, Tamaulipas
 Tijuana, Baja California
 Nuevo Laredo, Tamaulipas
 Campeche, Campeche
 Veracruz, Veracruz
 Acapulco, Guerrero
 Dolores Hidalgo, Guanajuato
 Pachuca, Hidalgo
 Durango, Durango
 Ensenada, Baja California

See also

 List of Mexican flags
 State flags of Mexico
 Flag flying days in Mexico
 Himno Nacional Mexicano
 Coat of arms of Mexico

References

External links

 The Flag of Mexico 
 
 Presidency of Mexico – National Symbols 
 Artes e historia – Bandera de Mexico 
 Las Banderas de México A Través de Su Historia (Especial: Día de la Bandera) 

Mexico
 
Mexico
National symbols of Mexico
Mexico
Mexican culture